L. Beth Cohen (born 1970 or 1971 on Long Island, New York) is an American musician and songwriter. She has toured with Barry Gibb and the Bee Gees, Jon Secada, and Chayanne. She has also appeared on stage with Julio Iglesias, Kelly Clarkson, and Isaac Hayes. She has done session work for Jon Secada, Barbra Streisand, Boston, Pink, Teddy Geiger, Alejandro Sans, and Paulina Rubio. She joined the rock band Boston in 2015.

References

External links
 Official website
 

1970 births
American rock guitarists
American women guitarists
Boston (band) members
Guitarists from New York City
Living people